The 2014–15 season will be Sporting Goa's 8th season in the I-League and 15th season in existence.

Durand Cup

Quarter-finals

Semi-finals

Transfers
Sporting Goa began signing players for the new season as early as April when they signed Tata Football Academy graduate Jarman Jeet Singh.

In

References

Sporting Clube de Goa
Sporting Clube de Goa seasons